Luke Paul Anthony Newton (né Atkinson; born 5 February 1993) is an English actor. He is known for playing Colin, the third Bridgerton child, in the Netflix series Bridgerton (2020–present). He also had roles in the BBC Two drama The Cut (2009) and the Disney Channel series The Lodge (2016).

Early life
Newton is from Shoreham-by-Sea, West Sussex. He has a younger sister, Lauren. Their parents divorced, and their mother Michelle remarried in 2006. Newton attended St Nicolas and St Mary’s First and Middle School from 5 to 11 years old. He also attended Northbrook College Sussex (now part of Greater Brighton Metropolitan College). He then formed the boy band South 4 with Oli Reynolds (then Evans), Joel Baylis, and Henry Tredinnick. He went on to train at the London School of Musical Theatre.

Career
In 2010, Newton made his television debut in the BBC Two teen series The Cut as Luke Attwood, a role he portrayed for 11 episodes. In 2014, he appeared in two episodes of the BBC soap opera Doctors as Sam Hern. From 2016 to 2017, Newton starred in the Disney Channel series The Lodge as Ben Evans. While appearing on the series, he was also featured on the two accompanying soundtrack albums. In 2018, he starred in the Syfy television film Lake Placid: Legacy as Billy. In 2020, he began starring in the Netflix series Bridgerton as Colin Bridgerton.

Personal life
Newton has dyslexia. He is in a relationship with Welsh stage actress Jade Davies. 

Newton's grandfather Ken passed away during the COVID-19 pandemic; the family raised over £3,000 for the Love Your Hospital charity in his name.

Filmography

Television

Theatre

Awards and nominations

References

External links
 

Living people
1993 births
21st-century English male actors
Actors with dyslexia
English male child actors
English male musical theatre actors
English male television actors
English male stage actors
Male actors from Sussex
People educated at the BRIT School
People from Shoreham-by-Sea
Year of birth uncertain